Echiniscoidea is an order of tardigrades, a phylum of water-dwelling, eight-legged, segmented micro-animals. It was first described by Richters in 1926.

Families
The order Echiniscoidea consists of the following families:

References

External links 
 
 

 
Protostome orders